Dibromine pentoxide is the chemical compound composed of bromine and oxygen with the formula Br2O5. It is a colorless solid that is stable below −20 °C. It has the structure O2Br−O−BrO2, the Br−O−Br bond is bent with bond angle 121.2°. Each BrO3 group is pyramidal with the bromine atom at the apex.

Reactions
Dibromine pentoxide can be prepared by reacting a solution of bromine in dichloromethane with ozone at low temperatures and recrystallized from propionitrile.

References

Bromine(V) compounds
Oxides